On 22 July 2022, Israel attacked military positions near Damascus, Syria, killing three Syrian soldiers and wounding seven others.

Background
This attack is one of hundreds of Israeli attacks on Iranian targets inside Syria since 2013. Israel claims that it is working against Iranian entrenchment in Syria and preventing the delivery of lethal weapons to Hezbollah. The attack came one month after the bombing of Damascus International Airport, which left it out of service.

Reactions
 Iran: The Iranian Ministry of Foreign Affairs strongly condemned the Israeli missile attack and added in a statement that "the continued aggression of the Zionist entity and its attacks on Syria is a clear violation of the sovereignty and territorial integrity of this country."

 Yemen: In a statement, the Presidency of the House of Representatives expressed "its condolences and sympathy to the families of the victims of this brutal Zionist aggression.. Reaffirming its solidarity and standing, and of the Yemeni people, alongside Syria, as a parliament, government and people."

 Syria: The Ministry of Foreign Affairs sent two letters to the Secretary-General of the United Nations and the President of the Security Council, regarding the "Israeli" criminal attacks against the vicinity of Damascus."

References

2022 airstrikes
2022 in the Syrian civil war
July 2022 events in Asia
Airstrikes conducted by Israel
Israeli involvement in the Syrian civil war
Iran–Israel conflict during the Syrian civil war
July 2022 airstrikes